Hans Jacob Nørregaard (born 13 June 1832 in Christiania, died 30 March 1900) was a Norwegian colonel, aide-de-camp to king Charles and chairman of the Christiania Military Society.

He studied at the Norwegian Military Academy and the Norwegian Military College, and became a second lieutenant in 1851, a first lieutenant in 1854, a staff captain in 1867, a captain in 1875, and a lieutenant colonel and head of Trænkorpset in 1888. He held the court title kammerjunker at the Royal Court and served as aide-de-camp to king Charles from 1866. He was a member of the Royal Swedish Academy of War Sciences and has published several articles on military affairs. He was also a member of several governmental committees.

He was a son of captain of the artillery and deputy stable master at the Royal Court Paul Ludvig Rudolf Nørregaard (1804–34) and Sarine Pauline Bølling (1808–1899). After his father died 30 years old, his mother remarried to the physician and Surgeon General Jens Johan Hjort (1798–1873).

Hans Jacob Nørregaard was married to Elisabeth Sophie Dorothea Henriette Wegner (born 12 August 1839), daughter of the industrialist Benjamin Wegner. His mother-in-law's family owned Berenberg Bank. They were the parents of the noted war correspondent Benjamin Wegner Nørregaard (1861–1935), the wine merchant and consul in Tarragona Ludvig Paul Rudolf Nørregaard (1863–1928) and the barrister and president of the Norwegian Bar Association Harald Nørregaard (1864–1938), who founded the law firm today known as Hjort.

Honours 
Knight First Class of the Order of St. Olav (1881)
Order of St. Vladimir (1865)
Knight of the Order of the Dannebrog
Knight of the Legion of Honour
Fourth Class of the Order of the Medjidie

References

1832 births
1900 deaths
Military personnel from Oslo
Norwegian Military Academy alumni
Norwegian Military College alumni
Norwegian Army personnel
Recipients of the Order of St. Vladimir
Knights of the Order of the Dannebrog
Chevaliers of the Légion d'honneur
Recipients of the Order of the Medjidie, 4th class
Burials at the Cemetery of Our Saviour
Members of the Royal Swedish Academy of War Sciences